Phytoecia neavei is a species of beetle in the family Cerambycidae. It was described by Per Olof Christopher Aurivillius in 1914. It is known from the Democratic Republic of the Congo.

References

Phytoecia
Beetles described in 1914
Endemic fauna of the Democratic Republic of the Congo